Octeville-l'Avenel is a commune in the Manche department in Normandy in north-western France.

Notable people
Robert Avenel, Anglo-Norman magnate

See also
Communes of the Manche department

References

Octevillelavenel